Dick Robertson (New York City, July 3, 1903 – 1979) was an American popular big band singer and songwriter of the 1930s and 1940s. He sang for many bandleaders such as Leo Reisman and Roger Wolfe Kahn and His Orchestra, and was on the artist roster at Banner Records.  In fact, he was one of the most prolific New York based vocalists (along with Irving Kaufman, Chick Bullock, Scrappy Lambert, Elmer Feldkamp, Paul Small and Smith Ballew) on scores of records from late 1928 through the mid 1930s.  A series of records issued on Melotone/Perfect/Banner/Oriole/Romeo, Crown, Bluebird from 1930-1934 were issued under his name or are listed in the 2010 edition of "American Dance Bands on Record and Film (1915-1942)" by Richard J. Johnson and Bernard H. Shirley as being under his nominal leadership. His last recording session as a singer was in 1949. He also used the pseudonym Bob Richardson for some recordings on Mayfair Records.

As a songwriter his biggest hit was "We Three (My Echo, My Shadow and Me)" in 1940. The Sinatra version of the song was re-released on The Song Is You (album) and again on Frank Sinatra & the Tommy Dorsey Orchestra. Jukebox Ella: The Complete Verve Singles, Vol. 1

As songwriter
 "I'd Do It All Over Again", 1945, co-written with Frank Weldon and James Cavanaugh.

As singer
 "Singin' in the Bathtub", 1929
 "Lazy Day", 1932
 "Lovable", 1932
 "If I Ever Get a Job Again", 1933 [with Gene Kardos and His Orchestra]
 "All I Do Is Dream of You", 1934
 "She Had to Go and Lose It at the Astor", 1940 - banned by the BBC
 "Any Bonds Today?", 1940
 "Ferryboat Serenade", 1941 - Number 1 in Australia
 "My Dreams Are Getting Better All the Time", 1945

References

External links
 Dick Robertson recordings at the Discography of American Historical Recordings.

Songwriters from New York (state)
1903 births
1979 deaths
20th-century American singers
20th-century American composers
20th-century American male singers
American male songwriters